Lepasta bractea is a moth of the family Notodontidae. It is found in Venezuela and Peru.

Subspecies
Lepasta bractea bractea (Venezuela)
Lepasta bractea gigantea Rothschild, 1917 (south-eastern Peru)

References

Moths described in 1874
Notodontidae of South America